Carex seticulmis is a tussock-forming species of perennial sedge in the family Cyperaceae. It is native to southern parts of Brazil.

See also
List of Carex species

References

seticulmis
Taxa named by Johann Otto Boeckeler
Plants described in 1869
Flora of Brazil